Groot-Bijgaarden Castle is a 12th-century castle in Groot-Bijgaarden in the municipality of Dilbeek, Flemish Brabant, Belgium. The castle was built for Almaric Bigard, the first lord of Bigard. Groot-Bijgaarden Castle is situated at an elevation of 47 meters.

Architecture
Construction began in the early 12th century.

The castle is surrounded by a wide moat spanned by a bridge with five arches, leading to the drawbridge. The central part of the gatehouse dates from the 14th century.

A four-storey tower (the "dungeon", built 1347), 30 metres high, is by the side of the gatehouse.

The castle is in the Flemish Renaissance style, with red brick and a slate roof.

In 1902, the castle was very dilapidated and Raymond Pelgrims Bigard began renovations that lasted 30 years.

Parks and gardens
Garden architect Louis Fuchs created the 14-hectare park alongside the castle at the start of the 20th century. The park is open in spring every year since 2003 for an international flower exhibition with tulips from the Netherlands.

See also
List of castles in Belgium

References

External links
 Official website

Buildings and structures completed in 1347
Towers completed in the 14th century
Castles in Belgium
Castles in Flemish Brabant
Dilbeek
Gardens in Belgium